The 1960 Texas A&M Aggies football team represented Texas A&M University in the 1960 NCAA University Division football season as a member of the Southwest Conference (SWC). The Aggies were led by head coach Jim Myers in his third season and finished with a record of one win, six losses and three ties (1–6–3 overall, 0–4–3 in the SWC).

Schedule

References

Texas AandM
Texas A&M Aggies football seasons
Texas AandM Aggies football